Jack Ram (born 14 January 1987) is a Tongan professional rugby union footballer. He plays for New England Free Jacks of Major League Rugby (MLR).

He represented the Tonga sevens team and Tonga national rugby teams between 2009–2015.

Early life
Ram's father, Samuel Santa Ram is a Fiji-Indian and is from Tavua. His mother is a Tongan who his father met and married in Australia. Ram was born in Australia, his parents moved to Tonga when he was 3 to start a business there. He plays club rugby for Lavengamalie Rugby Club. He represented the Tongan under-19 team in 2006.

Career
He joined Lavengamalie Rugby Club in 2005. In 2009, he played in the Pacific Rugby Cup for Tautahi Gold. In the same year, he was recruited into the Tonga sevens team. One of his biggest victory came in 2012 when he scored a try to help Tonga 7's beat the Fiji sevens side for the first time in history at the 2012 Wellington Sevens. He joined the Kerikeri rugby club in 2011. He represented Northland in the 2012 ITM Cup. A bad knee injury sidelined him for most of the 2013 ITM Cup.

In September 2014, an outstanding performance and his 2 tries helped Northland defeat Otago in the 2014 ITM Cup.

In June 2015, after the Blues suffered multiple injuries, Ram was called onto the bench for their final 2015 Super Rugby pool game against the Highlanders.

In December 2017, Ram signed for English club Doncaster Knights in the RFU Championship during the remainder of the 2017-18 season. On 12 April 2018, Ram signed for Championship rivals Coventry ahead of the 2018-19 season.

On 18 August 2020, Ram travels to USA to join New England Free Jacks in the Major League Rugby competition ahead of the 2020-21 season.

International career
He made his international debut for Tonga in the 2015 World Rugby Pacific Nations Cup against the United States in Toronto. He was then included in the Tongan team to the 2015 Rugby World Cup. He came off the bench against Georgia to replace the injured captain, Nili Latu. He started against Namibia 10 days later scoring two-tries and setting up another for winger, Telusa Veainu. He was awarded the Man of the Match in that game.

References

External links
 

Living people
1987 births
Tongan expatriate rugby union players
Northland rugby union players
Blues (Super Rugby) players
Rugby union flankers
Australian emigrants to New Zealand
Tongan rugby union players
Australian people of Indo-Fijian descent
Australian sportspeople of Tongan descent
Fijian people of Indian descent
Tongan people of Indo-Fijian descent
Sportspeople of Indian descent
Tonga international rugby union players
Rugby union number eights
Doncaster Knights players
Coventry R.F.C. players
New England Free Jacks players